Javier García Chico (born July 22, 1966 in Barcelona) is a retired Spanish pole vaulter, who won the bronze medal at the 1992 Summer Olympics held in Barcelona, Spain. Four years earlier in Seoul he was eliminated in the qualifying round. He competed in four consecutive Summer Olympics.

His personal best jump was 5.75 metres, achieved in August 1990 in Sant Cugat. He had 5.77 metres on the indoor track, achieved in March 1992 in Grenoble.

International competitions

References

1966 births
Living people
Spanish male pole vaulters
Athletes (track and field) at the 1988 Summer Olympics
Athletes (track and field) at the 1992 Summer Olympics
Athletes (track and field) at the 1996 Summer Olympics
Athletes (track and field) at the 2000 Summer Olympics
Olympic athletes of Spain
Olympic bronze medalists for Spain
Athletes from Catalonia
Athletes from Barcelona
Olympic bronze medalists in athletics (track and field)
Universiade medalists in athletics (track and field)
Universiade bronze medalists for Spain
Medalists at the 1992 Summer Olympics
Medalists at the 1989 Summer Universiade
Competitors at the 1994 Goodwill Games